Constantine "Con" Kudaba (born May 17, 1987, in New Westminster, British Columbia) is a male water polo player from Canada. He was a member of the Canada men's national water polo team, that claimed the bronze medal at the 2007 Pan American Games in Rio de Janeiro, Brazil.

He was a member of Canada's Olympic Squad at the 2008 Summer Olympics.

He was part of the Canadian team at the 2013 World Aquatics Championships in Barcelona, Spain, where they finished in 11th place.

He played professionally in the Australian National Water Polo League for the Victorian Seals.

He is currently a teacher at Chatelech Secondary School in Sechelt, BC.

Self appointed captain of Team Soil of the Soil vs Oil yearly golf tournament. Constantine was able to lead his team to victory in 2021. But in the 2022 tournament, his leadership skills came up short on Sunday as Team Oil was able to secure the championship.

References

 Canadian Olympic Committee

1987 births
Living people
Canadian male water polo players
Sportspeople from New Westminster
University of Calgary alumni
Water polo players at the 2007 Pan American Games
Water polo players at the 2008 Summer Olympics
Water polo players at the 2011 Pan American Games
Olympic water polo players of Canada
Pan American Games silver medalists for Canada
Pan American Games bronze medalists for Canada
Pan American Games medalists in water polo
Water polo players at the 2015 Pan American Games
Medalists at the 2007 Pan American Games
Medalists at the 2011 Pan American Games
Medalists at the 2015 Pan American Games